Aquasky is an English electronic group composed of Dave Wallace, Kieron Bailey, and Brent Newitt. In early 1995 they got together to produce their own music.  Shortly afterwards they sent a demo tape to Moving Shadow records and the seeds of a musical alliance were sown. The first single 'Dezires / Images' (Shadow 64) was released three months later and remixed by Krust (Shadow 64R).

Originally a drum and bass outfit, the trio have also become involved in the breaks scene using the moniker Aquasky vs. Masterblaster to denote their breaks projects. They retained Aquasky for drum and bass projects. The addition of Masterblaster however led to great confusion amongst fans. So Masterblaster was dropped and everything is once again being released under the name Aquasky. The trio are also responsible for creating and running the Passenger label established in 1997 (as well as its sister label 777 established in 2004) which continues to release their style of heavy drum and bass influenced breaks. Their latest effort is the 'Teamplayers' EP which features collaborations with many influential electronic artists including The Breakfastaz, Tayo, The Ragga Twins and Meat Katie.

The trio now operate under the name "Black Noise" releasing electro house songs for "Southern Fried Records"

Albums
Orange Dust (1997)
Bodyshock (1999)
Aftershock (2000)
Beat the System (2002)
Stay Fresh (2003)
Breakbeat Bass (2005)
Teamplayers (2006)
Raise the Devil (2011)
Bring da Ruckus (2013)
Shadow Era (2015)

References

External links
 Official site
 
 

English electronic music groups
British drum and bass music groups
British musical trios
Breakbeat music groups
Musical groups from Bournemouth